City of Dragons is a 2011 fantasy novel by American writer Robin Hobb, the third book in The Rain Wild Chronicles. It was released in September 2011 and is a direct continuation of the previous novel: Dragon Haven.

Plot summary

Characters 
Alise Kincarron Finbok – one of the main protagonists, a self-taught scholar of dragons.
Thymara – one of the main protagonists, keeper to Sintara.
Sintara – one of the main protagonists, a blue dragon (Thymara's dragon).
Captain Leftrin  – one of the main protagonists, Captain of the barge Tarman.
Sedric  – one of the main protagonists, secretary to Hest Finbok, he is assigned to accompany Alise Finbok on her journey.  Keeper of Relpda.
Tats – keeper of the dragon Fente, childhood friend of Thymara and a former slave.
Sylve – keeper of the dragon Mercor.
Rapskal – keeper of the dragon Heeby.

Minor Characters
Carson Lupskip   – a hunter and an old friend of Leftrin's.
Davvie   – a hunter (bowman) and nephew to Carson.
Ranculos   – a scarlet, male dragon.
Sestican   – an azure, male  dragon, kept by Warken.
Mercor   – a golden dragon, tended by Sylve. Implied to have previously been the sea serpent Maulkin.
Heeby – a small red dragon queen, tended by Rapskal.
Greft  – eldest of the keepers, keeper to Kalo.
Jerd – keeper of the dragon Veras.
Fente   – a green dragon queen with a nasty temperament, tended by Tats.
Veras   – a dragon, tended by  Jerd.
Arbuc   – Alum's dragon.
Kalo   – a blue-black male dragon, the largest of their clan, tended by Greft. 
Spit – an unclaimed, stunted silver dragon with a wounded tail.
Relpda – a sickly copper dragon queen, tended by Sedric.
Kase – a dragon keeper, cousin to Boxter.
Boxter – a dragon keeper, cousin to Kase.
Alum – a dragon keeper to Arbuc.
Nortel – a dragon keeper; one of Greft's closest supporters.
Harrikin – a dragon keeper, foster brother to Lecter. He is the second oldest keeper at 20 years.
Lecter – a dragon keeper, foster brother to Harrikin.
Skelly   – Deckhand on Tarman and niece of Leftrin.
Big Eider   – Deckhand on Tarman.
Hennesey   – Mate on Tarman.
Hest Finbok   – Husband of Alise Finbok, a rich and important Bingtown trader.
Swarge  – Tillerman of the barge Tarman.
Bellin  – Wife to Swarge, a poleman on Tarman.
Tarman  – A liveship river barge made from wizardwood.

References

2011 American novels
2011 fantasy novels
Novels by Robin Hobb
HarperCollins books
Novels about dragons